"Rok da House" is the debut single by British production trio the Beatmasters featuring hip hop duo the Cookie Crew. Released as a single in 1987, the song was a top 40 hit in at least seven countries. In the UK, its first release only managed a peak of No. 79, but a remix six months later was much more successful, peaking at No. 5 on the UK Singles Chart in early 1988. In 1989, a further remix known as "Rok da House (W.E.F.U.N.K.)" appeared on their debut studio album Anywayawanna.

"Rok da House" is known to be the very first hip house record, having been written and pressed to vinyl in August 1986.

Music video
The music video accompanies the 7" remix of the track and features black and white footage of cartoon characters and footage of building demolitions, with occasional colour text of the lyrics appearing.

Track listing
UK 12" single/French CD single
A1. "Rok da House (12" Original)" - 6:40
B1. "Rok da House (Latin Beat Remix)" - 7:30 (remixed by Ivan Ivan)
B2. "Rok da House (Junie's Mix)" - 5:37 (remixed by Ivan Ivan)

UK 7" 1987 single
A1. "Rok da House (7" Original)" - 3:50
B1. "Rok da House (The Music)" - 5:30

UK 7" 1988 single
A1. "Rok da House (7" Remix)" - 3:20 (remixed by Mark Saunders & the Beatmasters)
B1. "Rok da House (7" Original)" - 3:50

UK 12" 1988 single
A1. "Rok da House (12" Remix)" - 6:40 (remixed by Mark Saunders & the Beatmasters)
B1. "Rok da House (It's A Demo)"
B2. "Rok da House (The Music)" - 5.30

UK 12" 1988 single
A1. "Rok da House (Demolition Mix)" (remixed by Mark Saunders)
B1. "Rok da House (Al' Nite Al' Rite Instrumental)" (remixed by Mark Saunders)

Charts

References

1986 songs
1987 debut singles
British house music songs
Hip house songs
UK Independent Singles Chart number-one singles